Claire Elise Schreiner (born 1987) is an American beauty pageant winner and former athlete. She was the Miss Wyoming USA 2010 titleholder and placed 11th at the Miss USA 2010 pageant.

Athletics
Schreiner competed in both gymnastics and track and field in high school. She attended Campbell County High School in Gillette, Wyoming. She was a four-time state champion in gymnastics and won the individual all-round competition in each of her last three years. She also competed in track during this time and finished second in high jump at the Wyoming State Finals. She went on to attend UNLV on a track scholarship. Her events were high jump, hurdles, 200M, 400M, and pentathlon. Her major was journalism with an emphasis in broadcast journalism.

Schreiner did an internship with ESPN's Kenny Mayne, working on his internet show "Mayne Street." She worked as a researcher for ABC's Dancing With the Stars.

Beauty pageants
Schreiner competed in the Miss Wyoming USA 2010 pageant and won. She then went on to compete in the Miss USA 2010 pageant and become the second Wyoming contestant to ever place in the top 15.

Personal life
On July 26, 2015, Schreiner became engaged to The Insider host Michael Yo. The couple married on February 14, 2016.

References

1987 births
Living people
Miss USA 2010 delegates
UNLV Rebels women's track and field athletes
People from Gillette, Wyoming
People from Grant, Nebraska
Track and field athletes from Wyoming
Participants in American reality television series